WTJK (105.3 FM) is a Regional Mexican formatted broadcast radio station licensed to Humboldt, Tennessee, United States.

WTJK serves the Jackson, Tennessee listening area, and is owned by Grace Broadcasting Services, Inc.

History
On September 15, 2012 the then-WTJW changed their format from news/talk to contemporary Christian, branded as "The Dove", under new call letters, WDVW.

On January 1, 2015 WDVW flipped to classic hits as "Hippie Radio 105.3", with a callsign change to WHPP. The station changed its call sign to WTJK on January 9, 2018. On January 15, 2018 WTJK changed their format from classic hits to talk.

On April 20, 2018 WTJK changed their format from talk (which moved to WTJS 93.1 FM Alamo) to sports, branded as "Fox Sports Jackson".

On September 14, 2022 WTJK changed their format from sports (which moved to WJPJ 1190 AM Humboldt) to Regional Mexican, branded as "La Poderosa 105.3".

Previous logos

References

External links

TJK
Radio stations established in 1989
1989 establishments in Tennessee
Spanish-language radio stations in Tennessee